Fright Night is a 1947 short subject directed by Edward Bernds starring American slapstick comedy team The Three Stooges (Moe Howard, Larry Fine and Shemp Howard, in his first starring role after returning to the act). It is the 98th entry in the series released by Columbia Pictures starring the comedians, who released 190 shorts for the studio between 1934 and 1959.

Plot
The Stooges are managers of a beefy boxer named Chopper Kane (Dick Wessel), and they bet their bank roll on his next fight. When a gangster (Tiny Brauer) tells them to have Chopper lose (as he has a lot of money bet on his opponent Gorilla Watson) or they will lose their lives, the boys decide to play along. They try to soften Chopper up by feeding him rich food and having him spend time with their friend Kitty (Claire Carleton). The fight gets canceled when Kitty dumps Chopper for Gorilla and, in a fluke accident, Gorilla gets entangled with Moe and breaks his hand against a wall. The Stooges think they have put one over on the gangsters, only to have the bad guys corner them in a deserted warehouse. Instead of being rubbed out, the boys capture the crooks and get a reward.

Cast

Credited
 Moe Howard as Moe
 Larry Fine as Larry
 Shemp Howard as Shemp
 Dick Wessel as Chopper Kane
 Claire Carleton as Kitty Davis

Uncredited
 Harold Brauer as Big Mike
 Cy Schindell as Moose
 Heinie Conklin as Watson's manager
 Sammy Stein as Gorilla Watson
 Stanley Blystone as Cop
 Dave Harper as Cop
 Tom Kingston as Chuck

Production notes
Fright Night marked the return of Shemp Howard to the Stooges, who had last performed with the act 17 years prior. Shemp agreed to rejoin the act until brother Curly Howard recovered enough to return to the Stooges (Curly never did). It was filmed June 5–8, 1946: production commenced less than one month after Curly suffered a debilitating stroke on May 6. The film was remade in 1955 as Fling in the Ring, using ample stock footage. It was Shemp's favorite Stooge film.

References

External links
 
 

1947 films
The Three Stooges films
American boxing films
American black-and-white films
1947 comedy films
Films directed by Edward Bernds
Columbia Pictures short films
American comedy short films
1940s English-language films
1940s American films